The Kano Emirate was a Muslim state in Northern Nigeria formed in 1349 during the reign of Sarkin Kano Ali Yaji when Wangarawa brought Islam into Kano and Sarki Ali made Islam as State religion (www.rumburilmi.com.ng). Sarki Muhammadu Rumfa (1463-1499) consolidated the achievement of Sarki Ali Yaji when he became Sarki. Rumfa's reign is believed to be the greatest in terms of both economic and intellectual development till date. He helped introduce Ajami (a Hausa language writing using Arabic texts) which continued until 1903 with the beginning of British colonialism after they deposed a fulani Sarki named Ali Babba. It was during the time of Sarki Rumfa a Muslim scholar who was a Berber called Muhammadu bn Abdul-Karim al-Maghili arrived Kano (1440-1505). He was embraced by Sarki Rumfa who in turn assisted in the consolidation of Islam as Kano state religion. It was Sarki Muhammadu Rumfa who constructed the current Mosque adjacent to Emir's palace which is popularly known as Masallacin Sarki (i.e. Sarki's mosque) and he is acknowledged to be the one who constructed the present Emir's palace (Gidan Rumfa) and occupied it leaving the former palace to be converted as Museum (Gidan Makama Museum). During and after the British colonial period, the powers of the emirate were steadily reduced. The emirate is preserved and integrated into modern Nigeria as the Kano Emirate Council.
References: Adamu, A. U. (2007). Kano Kwaryar Kira Matattarar Alheri. Littafi na Data. Kano Government Press.
Kwalli, M. K. (1996). Kano Jalla Babbar Hausa.

History

Hausa kingdom and Sultanate

The Hausa Kingdom of Kano was based on an ancient settlement of Dala Hill.
While small chiefdoms were previously present in the area, according to the Kano Chronicle, Bagauda, a grandson of the mythical hero Bayajidda, became the first king of Kano in 999, reigning until 1063.
Muhammad Rumfa ascended to the throne in 1463 and reigned until 1499.
During his reign he reformed the city, expanded the Sahelian Gidan Rumfa (Emir's Palace), and played a role in the further Islamization of the city as he urged prominent residents to convert.
The Hausa state remained independent until the Fulani conquest of 1805.

Fulani conquest and rule
At the beginning of the 19th century, Fulani leader Usman dan Fodio led a jihad affecting much of northern Nigeria, leading to the emergence of the Sokoto Caliphate.
Kano became the largest and most prosperous province of the empire.
It was one of the last major slave societies. Heinrich Barth, a classical scholar who spent several years in northern Nigeria in the 1850s, estimated the percentage of slaves in Kano to be at least 50%, most of whom lived in slave villages.

From 1893 until 1895, two rival claimants for the throne fought a civil war. With the help of royal slaves, Yusufu was victorious over Tukur and claimed the title of emir.

Fall
The British pacification campaign termed Kano-Sokoto Expedition set off from Zaria at the end of January 1903 under the command of Colonel Morland. British officers and N.C.O.s and 800 African rank and file. Apart from a company of mounted infantry and a few gunners, the whole force consisted of infantry. They were supported, however, by four 75-mm. mountain guns, which could if necessary be dismantled and transported by porters, and by six machine guns.

After sporadic fighting outside the walls of the fort, the British managed to penetrate the defensive parameters of the capital. Kano was mostly left defenseless at the time, the Emir, Aliyu Babba was away with its large contingent Cavalry for the Autumn Campaign at Sokoto. News of the British capture of Kano in February 1903 sent the Cavalry in a long march to retake the city.

After successfully defeating the British in three encounters, on 27 February 1903, the Grand Vizier of Kano; Ahmadu Mai Shahada and much of the Kano Cavalry was ambushed at Katarkwashi.
The death of the Vizier and subsequent capture and exile to Lokoja of the 7th emir of Kano; Aliyu Babba spelled the formative end of the Kano Emirate.
The British made Kano an important administrative centre and kept most of the Emirates institutions in the form of the Kano Emirate Council subject to the British crown in a newly formed state called Northern Nigeria.

Emirs

Emirs of Kano under Sokoto vassalage
Emirs under Sokoto Caliphate vassalage were:

Suleiman dan Abu Hamma ( r. 1805–1819)
Ibrahim Dabo dan Mamudu ( r. 1819–1846)
Usman I dan Ibrahim Dabo ( r. 1846–1855)
Abdullah Maje Karofi dan Ibrahim Dabo ( r. 1855–1883)
Mohammed Bello dan Ibrahim Dabo ( r. 1883–1893)
Mohammed Tukur dan Mohammed Bello ( r.1893–1894)
Aliyu Babba dan Abdullahi Maje Karofi ( r. 1894–1903)

See also
List of rulers of Kano

References

Kano
History of Northern Nigeria
Emir of Kano
1807 establishments in Africa
1903 disestablishments in Nigeria